The James Bishop House, known as the Bishop House, is a historic building on the College Avenue campus of Rutgers University in New Brunswick, New Jersey. Bishop House was built in 1852 for James Bishop, a prominent businessman and politician from New Brunswick in the latter half of 19th century. Located off of and facing College Avenue, the Bishop House is an example of an Italianate, or "Italian Villa" style mansion, popular from the 1850s to late 1870s in New Brunswick. Due to the building's significant associations with architecture, education, industry, politics and religion, it was added to the National Register of Historic Places on July 12, 1976.

History
The Bishop House was named in honor of James Bishop. Bishop was a politician at the local, state, and federal levels in the 1850s through the 1890s. After the Panic of 1873, Bishop was forced to file for bankruptcy, leading to the firing of his 18 servants and sale of his mansion to Mahlon C. Martin.

The building was sold to Rutgers University in 1925. It was used as the residence for the Dean of Men and his family until 1934. After 1934, the interior was altered to contain classrooms and offices. This remains its current use. The building still contains its original 42 rooms despite alterations made.

Gallery

References

External links
 
 
 

Rutgers University buildings
Buildings and structures in New Brunswick, New Jersey
National Register of Historic Places in Middlesex County, New Jersey
University and college buildings on the National Register of Historic Places in New Jersey
New Jersey Register of Historic Places
Historic American Buildings Survey in New Jersey
Italianate architecture in New Jersey
1852 establishments in New Jersey